Anushka Sen (born 4 August 2002) is an Indian television actress and model known for portraying the role of Meher in the children fantasy show, Baal Veer. She has also played Manikarnika Rao/Rani Lakshmi Bai in the Indian historical drama television series Jhansi Ki Rani.

Personal life
Sen was born in Ranchi in a Bengali Baidya family, later moving to Mumbai along with her family. She studied at Ryan International School, Kandivali and scored 89.4% in 12th standard CBSE board exam as a commerce student. As of 2021, she is pursuing a degree in filmography at Thakur College of Science and Commerce, Mumbai.

Career
Sen began her career as a child actor in 2009 with Zee TV's serial Yahan Main Ghar Ghar Kheli. In the year, her first music video Humko hai Aasha was released. In 2012, she became popular playing the character of Meher in the TV serial Baal Veer. In 2015, she appeared in the Bollywood film Crazy Cukkad Family.

She has acted in TV serials Internet Wala Love and Devon Ke Dev...Mahadev. She appeared in the period drama film Lihaaf: The Quilt and also acted in a short film Sammaditthi. In 2020 she was a lead in the TV show Apna Time Bhi Aayega but left after three weeks. She has also appeared in several music videos, the latest being Chura Liya.

She is known for playing the historical character Manikarnika Rao a.k.a Rani Lakshmi Bai in the 2019 series Khoob Ladi Mardaani – Jhansi Ki Rani.     In May 2021, she entered the stunt-based reality TV show Fear Factor: Khatron Ke Khiladi 11 and was eliminated in the seventh week. She was the youngest contestant to appear on this show.

Filmography

Films

Television

Special appearances

Music videos

Web series

Nominations

See also
 List of Indian television actresses

References

External links

Living people
2002 births
People from Ranchi
Actresses from Jharkhand
Actresses from Mumbai
Indian film actresses
Indian television actresses
Indian web series actresses
Actresses in Hindi cinema
Actresses in Hindi television
21st-century Indian actresses
Fear Factor: Khatron Ke Khiladi participants